"Cilicia" is a sailing ship built by the "Ayas" Nautical research club. The ship "Cilicia" was built according to samples of widely spread ships that were built in the 13th century Armenian Kingdom of Cilicia. The ship built according to medieval shipbuilding traditions, starting from the outer design until the smallest detail. All these details were thoroughly studied by the members of the Ayas club with the help of manuscripts and illustrations. The ship's crew's clothing was also made per medieval traditions. During the voyage "Cilicia" visited 63 ports in 25 countries of Europe and Asia.

History 
Armenia has a rich tradition of shipping and shipbuilding. Armenian kingdoms have been known in history for their powerful navies for centuries. The 5th century historian Movses Khorenatsi mentions that during the reign of King Artashes I (189-160 BC), river and lake navigation began, he ruled the area between the two seas and with many ships filled the ocean.

Ayas 
“Ayas” Nautical research club was founded in 1985 with the aim of studying the history of Armenian shipbuilding and navigation and restoring the traditions of the Armenian Navy.  For more than 37 years the club has been collecting historical items and has restored more than 26 types of ships that had been built in historical Armenia. The wide activities of the club include the collection and study of historical facts about the shipbuilding, navigation, and the navy of Armenia and the Armenian kingdom of Cilicia, as well as the restoration of historic ships and the implementation of underwater archaeological research. During more than three and a half decades of its existence, the club has collected many historical objects. The members of the club have done huge scientific research work, published many scientific works, and participated in various scientific conferences, including international ones .
As Karen Balayan, the president of Ayas club notes.

Karen Balayan

The history of building the ship “Cilicia” 
In May 1991, the club started to build a life-size replica of the 13th century merchant ship, which it named Cilicia after the Armenian Kingdom of Cilicia, where the original was built 800 years ago. The sailing ship “Cilicia” was built according to medieval methods. In 2002 the ship was launched on Lake Sevan, where she was tested for about 2 years.  In 2004 the ship was moved to Poti Port in Georgia, where the first sea campaign began in a closed loop around Europe. In 2004-2006 “Cilicia” traveled more than 15000 nautical miles visiting 65 ports in 25 countries. While traveling the ship carried the flags of Armenia and Artsakh which was an important political message. Parallel to increasing the recognition of Armenia in the world, the ship is a symbol of pride that unites all Armenians.

The building of the ship “Cilicia” 
The ship was reconstructed according to medieval miniatures and manuscripts and is a replica of merchant sailing ships of the 13th century Armenian Kingdom of Cilicia. This replica was built with the exact size and much time was spent by the AYAS club in Matenadaran Institute of Ancient Manuscripts in Yerevan, as well as libraries and archives in Moscow, London, and Venice. Different illustrations of the same type of ships painted by different authors were used to get a composite ship structure. Al the vessels presented on miniatures are real ships and not a simple result of the fantasy of the artist. The members of the club used Armenian miniatures, that illustrate scenes from the Bible or Armenian fishing ships.
During the construction of the ship, medieval traditions, technologies and same materials were used. Traditionally in the Eastern Mediterranean region cedar, oak and Mediterranean pine were used for shipbuilding. Taking into consideration their abilities and trying to follow the traditions, the team of AYAS chose oak and pine for construction. The ship's frame is made of oak - it provides for a dense and solid frame that prevents rotting. The deck and planking are made of pine. All the works were made with maximum approximation to the reality of 13th century, with the use of the same tools and taking into account the structure of materials. The inner surfaces of the details of the construction were covered by wood resin with vegetable oil before it was established on site. The whole ship was filled with vegetable oil for preventing rotting and wood-borers, as it was accepted in the Eastern Mediterranean, following medieval technologies. The ship is 20 meters long and 5 meters wide, the draft is one and a half meters, the displacement is 50 tones, and the sail area is 100 square meters. The crew numbers 12–14. The building of the ship took 11 years.

The first testing 
The first testing was done on lake Sevan on May 25, 2002. Finally, the ship touched the waters of Lake Sevan. The ship sailed on Lake Sevan for two years, and during this time all medieval traditions and conditions were strictly followed and no modern technologies were used.

The timeline of the voyage of the ship “Cilicia” 
In 2004 the ship visited 23 ports and 12 countries in Europe and Asia. In 2005 “Cilicia” visited 24 ports and 6 countries, in 2006 18 ports, 20 countries. Every port the “Cilicia” visited was connected with a certain historical event. In 2004 the ship reached Venice from Poti, in 2005 “Cilicia” reached the Atlantic, and the English Channel, then the ship arrived to Portsmouth, in 2006 “Cilicia” sailed to St. Petersburg, afterward through Russian rivers and channels, they sailed down to Azov and Black sea, and then back to Armenia, but by land.

Conclusion 
From October 2004 to May 2005 the ship was moored on the island of San Lazzaro of the Mekhitarist Congregation in Venice. Many Armenians could visit the ship right there because this historically important Armenian island is a wonderful place for a victorious and meritorious ship, emphasizing its importance and profound value.  During its journeys the sailboat “Cilicia” was visited by different senior officials and famous people including the presidents of the Republic of Armenia, Catholicos Aram I of Cilicia, Baroness Cox, deputy speaker of the British Parliament, all the mayors of the cities visited during the trip, Dolph Lundgren, actor, director and producer, and Hrant Dink, editor of “Akos”, as well as others. There are very few cases of building replicas of Medieval ships, like the ship “Cilicia”. Today, the ship “Cilicia” is located in the Gegharkunik Province.

References 

Ships

External links 
360 Stories
26 "Cilicia" medieval vessel ideas | medieval, lake, historical